Rarities is a double compilation released by the band Goo Goo Dolls on June 25, 2021. The album features a total of 20 rare and unheard songs spanning from 1995 to 2007. Tracks include b-sides, live performances, radio performances, and acoustic renditions.

Track listing

Reception 
Emma Harrisons from Clashmusic gave the album a 7 out of 10, calling it "a toe-tapping panoramic view of Goo Goo Dolls’ body of work."

Charts

References

2021 compilation albums
Goo Goo Dolls compilation albums
Warner Records compilation albums